The NZR Q class were a pair of 2-4-4T type tank engines built by Rogers Locomotive and Machine Works in New Jersey. They were similar, in appearance, to the earlier K class of the same manufacturer and were purchased by the Rakaia & Ashburton Forks Railway Company for working their newly constructed railway to Methven from Rakaia, which later became the Methven Branch.

References

Bibliography 

 
 

Steam locomotives of New Zealand
Scrapped locomotives
Railway locomotives introduced in 1878
3 ft 6 in gauge locomotives of New Zealand